Pablo the Penguin may refer to:

 A character from the Disney film The Three Caballeros
 A character from the Nickelodeon TV show The Backyardigans